The Medieval Chola emperor Rajendra Chola I led an Chola Expedition of the Ganges between 1019 and 1021. The expedition traversed the states of Vengi, Kalinga, Madhya Pradesh, Jharkhand, Odda, Bengal, Bihar and Uttar Pradesh culminating with their arrival at the Ganges river. The Chola victory over the Pala king Mahipala I is considered to be the climax of the expedition. In 1019 CE, Rajendra's forces marched through Kalinga towards the river Ganga. In Kalinga the Chola forces defeated Indraratha the ruler of the Somavamsi dynasty. The Chola army eventually reached the Pala kingdom of Bengal where they defeated Mahipala. The Chola army also defeated the last ruler of the Kamboja Pala dynasty Dharmapala of Dandabhukti. The Chola army went on to raid East Bengal and defeated Govindachandra of the Chandra dynasty and invaded Bastar region.

Causes 
The expedition is believed to have been necessitated by a succession dispute in the Eastern Chalukya kingdom where the claims of Rajaraja Narendra, the son of Vimaladitya, the previous king, and his queen Kundavai, were contested by Vishnuvardana Vijayaditya VII, a son of Vimaladitya through another wife. Vishnuvardhana Vijayaditya VII was supported by the Western Chalukya king Jayasimha II and the kings of Kalinga and Odda and posed a serious threat to Rajaraja Narendra. Rajaraja Narendra appealed for help from his maternal uncle, the Chola emperor, Rajendra Chola I who sent a large force under his general, Araiyan Rajarajan, a veteran of the Chalukya-Chola Wars. Araiyan Rajarajan defeated Vijayaditya and after driving of it him out, firmly established Rajaraja Narendra on the Eastern Chalukya throne.

Following this victory, Rajendra Chola I led an expedition northwards supported by an advance guard led by Araiyan Rajarajan, to punish the kings of Kalinga and Odda who had sided with Vijayaditya in the succession dispute.

Events 

The Thiruvalangadu plates state:

Rajendra Chola I defeated the kings of Kalinga and Odda (by seeking assistance of Paramaras and Kalachuris, with whom Indraratha was in a big conflict and Rajendra Chola exploited this situation) and marched up to the Godavari River, from where Araiyan Rajarajan led an army into Bengal. The details of the campaign are given in the Tamil praśasti of Rajendra Chola I.

Sakkarakottam, the place from where Araiyan Rajarajan led the campaign into Bengal is identified with the town of Chakrakotya or Chitrakoot, in the present-day Madhya Pradesh. Masunidesam, Maduraimandalam, Namanaikkonam and Pancapalli, too, are believed to be located to the north-west of Vengi. Following the conquest of these places in present-day Telangana, Madhya Pradesh and Chhattisgarh, Araiyan Rajarajan invaded Odda (present-day Orissa) and conquered it after defeating its ruler Indraratha. His next success was against Dharmapala, who ruled the kingdom of Dandabhukti located in the marshland between Orissa and Bengal. Rajarajan, then, defeated Ranasura, the ruler of Lada or Radha, identified as the part of West Bengal south of the Ganges River and Govindacharya of Vangala, located further to the east before confronting the Pala ruler Mahipala I. After defeating Mahipala in a pitched battle, Araiyan Rajarajan reached the Ganges and took some water with him on his journey back. He was met by Rajendra I on the banks of the Godavari and the combined armies returned home after conducting Rajaraja Narendra's coronation as the king of the Eastern Chalukyas.

Nature of the expedition 
There have been general disagreement among historians on the nature of the expedition. Early scholars such as V. Venkayya interpreted Rajendra Chola's campaign to "bring the waters of the Ganges into Chola territory" as a pilgrimage to the Ganges River. However, this theory has been refuted by later historians, most notable among them being K. A. Nilakanta Sastri. That the campaign was military in nature is suggested by the last line of the Thiruvalangadu plates which state that the king erected a Ganga-jalamayam jayasthambham or a "liquid pillar of victory" in the form of the Cholaganga tank.

Effects 
The Chola expedition to the Ganges had a long-lasting influence. According to R. D. Banerji, a Kannadiga chief who accompanied Araiyan Rajarajan on his campaign settled down in Bengal and founded the Sena dynasty. It is believed that the Karnata people of Mithila, too, might have descended from soldiers in the Chola army. The Siddhantasaravali of Trilocana Sivacharya claims that a large number of Saivite Brahmins from Bengal were taken to the Chola country where they were granted lands by Rajendra Chola I. They, eventually, settled down in Kanchipuram and the Cauvery Delta forming the Sivacharya community.

Notes

Bibliography 
 

Chola Empire
1020s in Asia
11th century in India
Pala Empire
Military expeditions
1010s in Asia
1019 in Asia
1024 in Asia
North India
Military campaigns involving the Chola Empire